Patomha (also Romanized as Pātomhā; also known as Bātamhā, Bātanbā, and Pātomhā Mījān) is a village in Rezvan Rural District, Jebalbarez District, Jiroft County, Kerman Province, Iran. At the 2006 census, its population was 112, in 26 families.

References 

Populated places in Jiroft County